The 1946–47 international cricket season was from September 1946 to April 1947.

Season overview

November

England in Australia

February

Ceylon in India

March

England in New Zealand

References

International cricket competitions by season
1946 in cricket
1947 in cricket